The United States Senate election in Illinois of 1954 took place on November 2, 1954. Incumbent Democratic United States Senator Paul Douglas was reelected to a second term.

Election information
The primary (held on April 13) and general election coincided with those for House and those for state elections.

Turnout
Turnout in the primaries was 27.07%, with a total of 1,431,554 votes cast. Despite a crowded field for the Republican nomination, the primaries experienced what The New York Times reporter Richard J. H. Johnston referred to as, "one of the lightest primary votes of recent years," in Illinois.

Turnout during the general election was 63.69%, with 3,368,021 votes cast. This election saw less votes cast than were cast in either of the two coinciding races for statewide executive offices in Illinois.

Democratic primary
Incumbent Paul Douglas was renominated, running unopposed.

Candidates
•Paul Douglas, incumbent U.S. Senator

Results

Republican primary
Joseph T. Meek won a crowded Republican primary.

Candidates
John B. Crane
Edgar M. Elbert, businessman and President of Lions Club International
Lawrence Daly, perennial candidate
Herbert F. Geisler, Chicago alderman
Edward A. Hayes, former Commander of The American Legion
Julius Klein, business executive, journalist, former spy and former United States Army general
Park Livingston, Trustee of University of Illinois and 1952 Illinois gubernatorial candidate
Joseph T. Meek, President of the Illinois Federation of Retail Associations
Deneen A. Watson
Austin L. Wyman, attorney

Results

General election

Results

See also 
 United States Senate elections, 1954

References

1954
Illinois
United States Senate